Prince Waldemar of Prussia (Joachim Friedrich Ernst Waldemar; 10 February 1868 – 27 March 1879) was the sixth child and youngest son of the German Crown Prince and Crown Princess, later Emperor Frederick III and Empress Victoria. Prince Waldemar was a grandson of both William I, German Emperor, and Queen Victoria of the United Kingdom.

Biography

Early life

Waldemar was the favourite of both the Princess Royal and her husband. He was a lively, cheerful boy, boisterous and high-spirited, with a sensible, independent and honest nature. He was quick to learn and his mother found him a pleasure to teach. Waldemar had a "fun loving" character and a great sense of humour and love for animals and sports. On one occasion, when visiting his grandmother, Queen Victoria, Waldemar let loose his pet crocodile in her study, much to the shock of the middle-aged queen. The Princess Royal wrote that she would be unhappy when Waldemar went off to school, "as he is my very own boy." She seemed to prefer Waldemar over his elder brothers Wilhelm and Heinrich.

Death
Less than four months after the deaths of his maternal aunt, Alice, Grand Duchess of Hesse and cousin, Marie, Waldemar became seriously ill with diphtheria and died in Berlin, Germany on 27 March 1879. He was buried in the royal mausoleum attached to the Friedenskirche at Potsdam, near the main altar and his elder brother Prince Sigismund of Prussia. His parents were later buried not far away in the centre of the mausoleum directly under the dome.

Ancestry

References
Richard Hough, Advice to a Grand-daughter. Letters from Queen Victoria to Princess Victoria of Hesse. London, 1975, p. 12.

Prussian princes
House of Hohenzollern
1868 births
1879 deaths
Infectious disease deaths in Germany
Deaths from diphtheria
Sons of emperors
Royalty who died as children
Children of Frederick III, German Emperor
Sons of kings